Dani van der Moot (born 7 March 1997) is a Dutch footballer who plays as a forward for Rijnsburgse Boys in the Tweede Divisie.

Career

Born in Zaandam, van der Moot started his youth career with Hellas Sport Combinatie. He then played with FC Volendam and  AZ Alkmaar, before joining PSV Eindhoven in 2012. He made his professional debut as Jong PSV player in the second division on 19 December 2014 against SC Telstar. He replaced Elvio van Overbeek after 62 minutes in a 1–1 home draw.

On 15 January 2019, van der Moot joined FC Volendam, which he also played for as a youth player. He left the club on 2 September 2019 to join Tweede Divisie club Rijnsburgse Boys. He made his debut for the club on 7 September 2019 in a 0–1 loss to VV Noordwijk, coming on as a substitute for Edo Knol in the 66th minute. On 28 September, he scored his first goals – a hat-trick – in a 5–2 away win over SVV Scheveningen.

References

1997 births
Living people
Dutch footballers
AZ Alkmaar players
PSV Eindhoven players
Jong PSV players
Jong FC Utrecht players
FC Volendam players
Rijnsburgse Boys players
Eerste Divisie players
Tweede Divisie players
Derde Divisie players
Footballers from Zaanstad
Association football forwards